The women's 500 m time trial competition at the 2019 European Games was held at the Minsk Velodrome on 30 June 2019.

Results

Qualifying
The top 8 riders qualified for the final.

Final

References

Women's 500 m time trial